The parade of sovereignties was a series of declarations of sovereignty of various degrees by the Soviet republics in the Soviet Union from 1988 to 1991. The declarations stated the priority of the constituent republic power in its territory over the central power, which led to the War of Laws between the centre and the republics. The process followed the loosened power grip of the Communist Party of the Soviet Union as a result of demokratizatsiya and perestroika policies under Mikhail Gorbachev. Despite the efforts of Gorbachev to preserve the union under a new treaty in the form of the Union of Sovereign States, many constituents soon declared their full independence. The process resulted in the dissolution of the Soviet Union.

The first top-level Soviet republic to declare independence was Estonia (November 16, 1988: Estonian Sovereignty Declaration, March 30, 1990: decree on the transition to the restoration of the Estonian statehood, May 8, 1990: Law on the State Symbols, which declared the independence, August 20, 1991: Law of the Estonian restoration of Independence).

The first lower-level subdivision to declare independence was the Nakhichevan Autonomous Soviet Socialist Republic (January 19, 1990 although Heydar Aliyev, the leader of Soviet Azerbaijan, having roots in Nakhchivan, managed to keep Nakhchivan within Azerbaijan).

The massive secessionist event has served as a testbench for various theories of secession.

References

Dissolution of the Soviet Union
Secession
Perestroika
Decentralization
Derussification